1955–56 was the forty-third occasion on which the Lancashire Cup completion had been held.
Leigh won the trophy by beating Widnes by the score of 26-9.
The match was played at Central Park, Wigan, (historically in the county of Lancashire). The attendance was 26,504 and receipts were £4,090.

Background 

The end of last season saw the demise of Belle Vue Rangers. With this and the retention of the invitation to juniors, Lancashire Amateurs the number of clubs was reduced by one to a total of 15.
The same pre-war fixture format was retained, and due to reduction in the number of clubs this resulted in one bye in the first round.
The whole tournament was again played on a knock-out basis, and there would be no return to the two legged fixtures during the life of the competition.

Competition and results

Round 1 
Involved  7 matches (with one bye but no “blank” fixture) and 15 clubs

Round 2 - quarterfinals 
Involved 4 matches (with no bye) and 8 clubs

Round 3 – semifinals  
Involved 2 matches and 4 clubs

Final

Teams and scorers 

Scoring - Try = three (3) points - Goal = two (2) points - Drop goal = two (2) points

The road to success

Notes and comments 
1 * Central Park was the home ground of Wigan with a final capacity of 18,000, although the record attendance was  47,747 for Wigan v St Helens 27 March 1959

See also 
1955–56 Northern Rugby Football League season
Rugby league county cups

References

External links
Saints Heritage Society
1896–97 Northern Rugby Football Union season at wigan.rlfans.com
Hull&Proud Fixtures & Results 1896/1897
Widnes Vikings - One team, one passion Season In Review - 1896-97
The Northern Union at warringtonwolves.org

1955 in English rugby league
RFL Lancashire Cup